A  is a female kemonomimi character with feline traits, such as , a cat tail, or other feline characteristics on an otherwise human body. Catgirls are found in various fiction genres and in particular Japanese anime and manga. Catboy is a term for a male equivalent of said character type.

History
The oldest mention of the term nekomusume comes from an 18th-century misemono in which a cat/woman hybrid was displayed. Stories of shape-shifting bakeneko prostitutes were popular during the Edo Period.

In Kenji Miyazawa's 1924 work,  is the first modern day example of a beautiful, cat-eared woman. In 1936, the nekomusume experienced a revival in kamishibai. The first anime involving catgirls, titled The King’s Tail (Ousama no Shippo), was made in 1949 by Mitsuyo Seo. In America, the DC Comics character Catwoman first appeared in 1940, and Cheetah first appeared in 1943.

Catgirls were further made popular in 1978 manga series The Star of Cottonland, by Yumiko Ōshima. By the 1990s, catgirls were common in Japanese anime and manga. Catgirls have since been featured in various media worldwide. Enough of a subculture has developed for various themed conventions and events to be held around the world, such as Nekocon.

Reception
Japanese philosopher Hiroki Azuma has stated that catgirl characteristics such as cat ears and feline speech patterns are examples of moe-elements. Azuma argued that although some otaku sexual expression involves catgirl imagery, few otaku have the sexual awareness to understand how such imagery can be perceived as perverted.
In a 2010 critique of the manga series Loveless, the feminist writer T. A. Noonan argued that, in Japanese culture, catgirl characteristics have a similar role to that of the Playboy bunny in western culture, serving as a fetishization of youthful innocence.

See also
 List of catgirls
 Animal roleplay
 Moe anthropomorphism
 Nekomata
 Furry fandom

References

External links
 
 

18th-century neologisms
Anime and manga terminology
 
Fictional species and races

de:Kemonomimi#Katzen